The Adroit-class minesweepers were a class of United States Navy s completed as minesweepers. However, they were considered unsatisfactory in this role, and were all eventually converted back into submarine chasers.

Adroit-class minesweepers 
 . Reclassified PC-1586.
 . Reclassified PC-1587.
 . Reclassified PC-1588.
 . Reclassified PC-1589.
 . Reclassified PC-1590.
 . Reclassified PC-1591.
 . Reclassified PC-1592.
 . Reclassified PC-1593.
 . Reclassified PC-1594.
 . Reclassified PC-1595.
 . Reclassified PC-1596.
 .  Reclassified PC-1597.
 . Reclassified PC-1598.
 . Reclassified PC-1599.
 . Reclassified PC-1600.
 . Reclassified PC-1601.
 . Reclassified PC-1602.
 . Reclassified PC-1603.

References 

 

 
Mine warfare vessel classes